John Reynell (floruit 1427/28) was a Member of Parliament for Devon in 1427/28.

Origins
He was a son of Walter Reynell (fl. 1404) of Malston in the parish of Sherford, Devon, and of  Badlingham in Cambridgeshire, a Member of Parliament for Devon in 1404, by his second wife Margaret Stighull, daughter and heiress of William Stighull (alias Styl, Stigill, etc) of Malston and East Ogwell, by his wife Elizabeth Malston, daughter and heiress of Robert Malston of Malston. His elder brother was Walter Reynell (died 1478) of Malston,  a Member of Parliament for Devon in 1454/55.

Marriage
He married Agnes Chichester, a daughter of the Chichester family then recently seated at Raleigh in the parish of Pilton, Devon.

Death
He predeceased his father without progeny.

References

English MPs 1427
Members of the Parliament of England (pre-1707) for Devon
John